Tanytarsus is a large genus of non-biting midges of the tribe Tanytarsini and subfamily Chironominae of the bloodworm family (Chironomidae). The larvae of these insects occur in a wide range of freshwater habitats with some species being marine.

Species
T. abdominalis Staeger, 1839
T. aberrans Lindeberg, 1970
T. abnormis Lehmann, 1981
T. alatus Paggi, 1992
T. aculeatus Brundin, 1949
T. anderseni Fittkau & Reiss, 1971
T. aquavolans Butler, 2000
T. bathophilus Kieffer, 1911
T. brundini Lindeberg, 1963
T. buchonius Reiss & Fittkau, 1971
T. chinyensis Goetghebuer, 1934
T. cretensis Reiss, 1987
T. curticornis Kieffer, 1911
T. debilis (Meigen, 1830)
T. dibranchius Kieffer, 1926
T. dispar Lindeberg, 1967
T. ejuncidus (Walker, 1856)
T. eminulus (Walker, 1856)
T. excavatus Edwards, 1929
T. fennicus  Lindeberg, 1970
T. fimbriatus Reiss & Fittkau, 1971
T. formosanus Kieffer, 1912
T. gibbosiceps Kieffer, 1922
T. glabrescens Edwards, 1929
T. gracilentus (Holmgren, 1883)
T. gregarius Kieffer, 1909
T. heusdensis Goetghebuer, 1923
T. inaequalis Goetghebuer, 1921
T. innarensis Brundin, 1947
T. lactescens Edwards, 1929
T. lapponicus  Lindeberg, 1970
T. latiforceps Edwards, 1941
T. lestagei Goetghebuer, 1922
T. longitarsis Kieffer, 1911
T. lugens (Kieffer in Thienemann & Kieffer, 1916)
T. mancospinosus Ekrem & Reiss, 1999
T. medius Reiss & Fittkau, 1971
T. mendax Kieffer, 1925
T. micksmithi (Cranston, 2000)
T. miriforceps (Kieffer, 1921)
T. multipunctatus Brundin, 1947
T. nemorosus Edwards, 1929
T. nearcticus Butler, 2000
T. niger Andersen, 1937
T. nigricollis Goetghebuer, 1939
T. norvegicus (Kieffer, 1924)
T. occultus Brundin, 1949
T. oscillans Johannsen, 1932
T. palettaris Vernaux, 1969
T. pallidicornis (Stephens in Walker, 1856)
T. palmeni Lindeberg, 1967
T. pseudolestagei Shilova, 1976
T. quadridentatus Brundin, 1947
T. recurvatus Brundin, 1947
T. reei Na & Bae, 2010
T. seosanensis Ree & Kim, 2003
T. signatus (van der Wulp, 1858)
T. simulans Lindeberg, 1967
T. sinuatus Goetghebuer, 1936
T. smolandicus Brundin, 1947
T. striatulus Lindeberg, 1976
T. sylvaticus (van der Wulp, 1858)
T. telmaticus Lindeberg, 1959
T. tika (Tourenq, 1975)
T. usmaensis Pagast, 1931
T. verralli Goetghebuer, 1928
T. volgensis Miseiko, 1967
T. zimbabwensis Harrison, 2004

References

Chironomidae
Diptera of Europe